The IVB-Philadelphia Golf Classic was a golf tournament on the PGA Tour. It was played at the Whitemarsh Valley Country Club in Lafayette Hill, Pennsylvania from 1963 to 1980.

Tournament highlights
1963: Arnold Palmer wins the inaugural version of the tournament by one shot over Lionel Hebert. The $26,000 first prize was the most Palmer collected for a win up to that time.
1965: Jack Nicklaus successfully defends his title. He eagles the 71st hole to win by 2 shots over Joe Campbell and Doug Sanders.
1966: Jack Nicklaus narrowly misses winning in Philadelphia for the third consecutive year. Don January beats him by one shot.
1969: A four-player sudden death playoff is won by Dave Hill when he makes an eleven-foot birdie putt on the first extra hole to defeat Tommy Jacobs, Gay Brewer, and R. H. Sikes.
1973: Tom Weiskopf wins for the second consecutive week. He beats Jim Barber by four shots.
1975: Tom Jenkins wins by one shot over Johnny Miller and by two over Bob Wynn. Wynn was leading by two shots until he made a quadruple-bogey eight on the tournament's 71st hole.
1976: Future World Golf Hall of Fame member Tom Kite wins for the first time on the PGA Tour. He defeats Terry Diehl on the fifth hole of a sudden death playoff.
1980: Doug Tewell wins the last edition of the tournament. He beats Tom Kite by one shot.

Winners

References

Former PGA Tour events
Golf in Pennsylvania
Sports in Philadelphia
Recurring sporting events established in 1963
Recurring sporting events disestablished in 1980
1963 establishments in Pennsylvania
1980 disestablishments in Pennsylvania